Henan Township is a township under the administration of Keshan County, in western Heilongjiang, China. , it has nine villages under its administration:
Xuexi Village
Erhe Village
Hua'an Village
Xingli Village
Lianhe Village
Renfa Village
Yongxing Village
Gongzheng Village
Dahe Village

References 

Township-level divisions of Heilongjiang
Keshan County